INT  (iodonitrotetrazolium or 2-(4-iodophenyl)-3-(4-nitrophenyl)-5-phenyl-2H-tetrazolium) is a commonly used tetrazolium salt (usually prepared with chloride ions), similar to tetrazolium chloride that on reduction produces a red formazan dye that can be used for quantitative redox assays. It is also toxic to prokaryotes.

INT is an artificial electron acceptor which can be utilized in a colorimetric assay to determine the concentration of protein in a solution. It can be reduced by succinate dehydrogenase to furazan, the formation of which can be measured by absorbance at 490 nm. The activity of succinate dehydrogenase is readily observed by the naked eye as the solution turns from colorless to rusty red.

See also 
 MTT assay

References

Dyes
Chlorides
Redox indicators
Tetrazoles
Electrochemistry